The Cathedral of the Assumption of the Blessed Virgin and St Michael the Archangel, commonly known as Vác Cathedral, is a religious building in the Catholic Church that serves as the cathedral of the Diocese of Vác, is located in the city of Vác in Hungary.

The diocese was founded in 1004 under Stephen I. The present church is the fifth structure on this site. The first cathedral was built in 1074, the same site of the present, but was destroyed in the fourteenth century, during the invasions of the Mongols. During the Ottoman occupation of Hungary the last remnants of the wall collapsed. Some of the residues are still visible today. Only after the departure of the Turks was possible to build a new church.

Construction work began in 1761. Already in 1772 the cathedral was consecrated. The work continued until its completion in 1777. In 1944 during World War II a Soviet bomb hit the dome without actually detonating so a cool church parishioners remember what considered a "miracle".

See also
Roman Catholicism in Hungary
List of cathedrals in Hungary

References

Roman Catholic cathedrals in Hungary
Cathedral
Roman Catholic churches completed in 1777
Buildings and structures in Pest County
18th-century Roman Catholic church buildings in Hungary